The Bendigo Botanic Gardens, formerly known as the White Hills Botanical Garden, are Australian botanic gardens in the Bendigo suburb of White Hills, Victoria. The gardens are one of regional Victoria's earliest botanic gardens.

The Bendigo Botanic Gardens were founded in 1857 after land had been reserved for the site on the 1854 plan of Bendigo.

In 1925, an Arch of Triumph was erected on the Napier Street (Midland Highway) entrance as a memorial to the fallen from the First World War.

References

Bendigo
Gardens in Victoria (Australia)
1857 establishments in Australia
Tourist attractions in Victoria (Australia)